Operation Grog was the name assigned to the British naval and air bombardment of Genoa and La Spezia on 9 February 1941, by a fleet consisting of , ,  and , screened by ten fleet destroyers including , , , ,  and .

Events
The operation was originally scheduled to start on 31 January 1941, but the ships didn't leave Gibraltar until 6 February.

Four destroyers carried out an anti-submarine sweep while the heavy ships carried out a feint to deceive Italian and German observers into thinking they were supporting a convoy.

Genoa harbour was bombarded on 9 February, with the force sinking four cargo ships and damaging 18. A majority of Italian sources only reported heavy damage on the merchant ships Salpi and Garibaldi and the sinking of the old civilian training ship Garaventa. Author Ermingo Bagnasco also reports the loss of fourteen lighters and the motor sailor Antonietta Madre. According to the official files of the Italian Marina Militare, the Antonietta Madre was sunk during the Allied air bombing of Genoa on 23 October 1942.

A salvo from HMS Malaya landed between 200 and 50 yards short of the battleship Duilio, undergoing repairs in dry dock north of Molo Giano; no damage was reported on the Italian battleship. A targeting error by a gunnery officer on board HMS Malaya some thirteen miles offshore caused an armour-piercing round to hit Genoa Cathedral; the shell failed to explode and remains on display there.

Ark Royals aircraft attacked Livorno and mined La Spezia.

An attempt by the Italian fleet to intercept the British force failed, and all ships returned to Gibraltar on 11 February.

There were 144 civilian dead and 272 wounded at Genoa as result of the shelling.

References

Allied naval victories in the battle of the Mediterranean
Naval battles and operations of World War II involving the United Kingdom
Naval aviation operations and battles
February 1941 events